Predators Holdings, LLC is a private company that owns and operates the Nashville Predators of the National Hockey League. The company also owns Powers Management, which manages the day-to-day operations of Bridgestone Arena. The company consists of local businessmen in a variety of areas.

Predators Holdings, LLC bought the Nashville Predators on December 7, 2007, from Craig Leipold for $193 million, who would buy the Minnesota Wild in 2008.

References

Sports holding companies of the United States
Entertainment companies established in 2007
2007 establishments in Tennessee
National Hockey League owners
Nashville Predators owners